Fractional Calculus and Applied Analysis is a peer-reviewed mathematics journal published by Walter de Gruyter. It covers research on fractional calculus, special functions, integral transforms, and some closely related areas of applied analysis.

The journal is abstracted and indexed in Science Citation Index Expanded, Scopus, Current Contents/Physical, Chemical and Earth Sciences, Zentralblatt MATH, and Mathematical Reviews.

External links
 

Mathematics journals
Publications established in 1998
Quarterly journals
De Gruyter academic journals
English-language journals